Lay It On Me is an EP by British singer-songwriter Nick Lowe. It is the third consecutive Nick Lowe EP to feature label-mates, Los Straitjackets, as his backing band. The EP was released through Yep Roc Records on June 5, 2020. Lay It On Me reached number 37 on Billboards Americana/Folk Albums chart.

Album background and recording 

Lay It On Me was recorded at Sawhorse Studios in St. Louis, Missouri. The EP was mixed at Silver Shark Studios in Tooting Bec, London, United Kingdom. The EP was mastered by Tony Cousins at Metropolis in London, UK.

Side A of Lay It On Me features two Nick Lowe originals, titled "Lay It On Me Baby" and "Don't Be Nice to Me." These originals are featured alongside a cover of the Dorsey Burnette-penned, Brenda Lee song "Here Comes That Feeling." Side B features a Los Straitjackets cover of Shocking Blue's "Venus". This cover was produced by Nick Lowe; his first production credit for an artist other than himself in 25 years. The last time Lowe produced another artist was in 1995, producing the Mavericks' cover of "Blue Moon" for the Apollo 13 soundtrack.

Nick Lowe performed "Lay It On Me Baby" for Rolling Stones "In My Room" on April 10, 2020. The performance featured his son, Roy Lowe, on drums and three other songs: "Trombone", "(What's So Funny 'Bout) Peace, Love, and Understanding", and "I Read a Lot."

Critical reception 

The title track "Lay It On Me Baby" premiered on Rolling Stones website on April 1, 2020. Angie Martoccio began the article with, "Nick Lowe has dropped a new song, 'Lay It on Me Baby,' off his upcoming EP, Lay It on Me, out June 5th via Yep Roc Records."

No Depression posted a review of Lay It On Me on June 4, 2020. Grant Britt ended his article with, "Crooner Lowe can still rock and roll, perhaps a little grayer, but still shakin', rattlin', and rollin' when the spirit moves him."

In an article for American Songwriter, Paul Zollo said, "American Songwriter is proud to premiere a new song by legendary songwriter-producer Nick Lowe. It's the title track of his new EP Lay It On Me, his third record with the Nashville band Los Straitjackets."

Lay It On Me was given a 3.5 out of 5 rating by AllMusic. Stephen Thomas Erlewine began his review with, "Now that Nick Lowe has reached his third EP of new material recorded with Los Straitjackets, it only stands to reason that the musicians have found the same groove in the studio as they do on-stage."

The EP was also reviewed by Scott Bauer for the Associated Press on June 3, 2020. Bauer began his review with, "In typical Nick Lowe fashion, the upbeat love song that's the title track of his latest EP, 'Lay It On Me,' is immediately followed by a note of caution: 'Don't Be Nice to Me.'"

Track listing

Personnel 
Credits taken from AllMusic.

 Nick Lowe – lead vocals, acoustic guitar, producer
Eddie Angel – guitar
Greg Townson – guitar 
Pete Curry – bass
Chris Sprague – drums, backing vocals

Production
Nathan Golub – cover illustrations, design  
Peta Waddington – art direction and aesthetics 
Tuck Nelson – recording engineer, mixing 
Assistance provided by Jason McEntire  
Tony Cousins – mastering

References 

2020 EPs
Nick Lowe albums
Los Straitjackets albums
Yep Roc Records EPs